Jamaluddin bin Mohd Radzi is a Malaysian politician. He was the state assemblyman for Behrang. In early 2009, along with Mohd Osman Mohd Jailu and Hee Yit Fong, he resigned from the People's Justice Party (PKR) to sit as an independent, supporting the fall of the Mohammad Nizar Jamaluddin-led government and precipitating the 2009 Perak Constitutional crisis.

Early career 
Jamaluddin was a postman and was in the business sector before joining politics.

Political career 
He contested the Behrang seat two times. In the 2004 Malaysian general election, he lost to the MIC candidate, Appalannaldu Rajoo. In the 2008 Malaysian general election he won against the MIC candidate, Ramasamy Muthusamy. He was a candidate to be Menteri Besar (First Minister) of Perak following the election, but Mohammad Nizar Jamaluddin from PAS was chosen.

2009 Perak constitutional crisis 
During the 2009 Perak Constitutional Crisis, Jamaluddin together with Mohd Osman Mohd Jailu and Hee Yit Fong declared themselves independent state assemblymen and supported Barisan Nasional to establish a new state government. In the 2013 Perak state elections, although Jamaluddin considered to defend his Behrang seat as an independent, he decided to not contest and lend his support to Barisan Nasional candidate Rusnah Kassim.

Attempt to join BERSATU 
On 15 May 2018, the by-then Menteri Besar of Perak, Ahmad Faizal Azumu stated in a press conference that Jamaluddin's application to join BERSATU had been rejected as he had taken part in the 2009 Perak constitutional crisis. Jamaluddin had applied to join BERSATU together with the Sungai Manik state assemblyman, Zainol Fadzi Paharudin.

As an independent candidate 
After years of not contesting any election, Jamaluddin attempted to make a comeback by contesting in the 2022 Malaysian general election at the Tanjong Malim federal seat as an independent. He however failed to make a major impression on the election, only garnering 1032 votes and losing his deposit.

Election results

Controversies

Corruption 
On 6 February 2013, all 3 judges in the Court of Appeal chaired by President of Court of Appeal Tan Sri Mohamed Raus Sharif unanimously acquitted him of corruption charges.

See also 

 Behrang (state constituency)
 2009 Perak constitutional crisis

Notes

References 

Independent politicians in Malaysia
Malaysian people of Malay descent
Members of the Perak State Legislative Assembly
Living people
1950s births
Year of birth uncertain